This article documents the chronology of the response to the COVID-19 pandemic in March 2022, which originated in Wuhan, China in December 2019. Some developments may become known or fully understood only in retrospect. Reporting on this pandemic began in December 2019.

Reactions and measures in the United Nations

Reactions and measures in Africa

Reactions and measures in the Americas

Reactions and measures in the Eastern Mediterranean

Reactions and measures in Europe

Reactions and measures in South, East and Southeast Asia

8 March
Malaysian Prime Minister Ismail Sabri Yaakob has announced that Malaysia will fully reopen its borders to foreign travellers from 1 April. Fully vaccinated travellers will be allowed to enter the country with having to undergo quarantine.

Reactions and measures in the Western Pacific

1 March
The New Zealand Cabinet has  approved the Novavax COVID-19 vaccine for people aged 18 and above. The first doses are expected to arrive in the country in March 2022.

9 March
New Zealand COVID-19 Response Minister Chris Hipkins announced that the isolation period for COVID-19 positive cases and household contacts would be reduced from ten days to seven days from 11:59pm on 11 March 2022.

16 March
New Zealand will allow fully-vaccinated tourists from Australia to enter the country from 13 April 2022 without having to go into managed or self-isolation.

18 March
American Samoa's Department of Health has suspended all flights to the Manu'a Islands after 800 cases were reported on the main island of Tutuila.
The Vanuatu Government has imposed a curfew in commercial stores and ordered the closure of roadside food stalls and kava bars in response to a surge in cases nationwide.

23 March
New Zealand Prime Minister Jacinda Ardern announced that the Government would ease outdoor and indoor gathering restrictions by 11:59pm on 25 March 2022. In addition, vaccine pass requirements and the vaccine mandates for educators, Police, and Defence Force personnel would be eliminated from 11:59pm on 4 April.

See also 

 Timeline of the COVID-19 pandemic in March 2022
 Responses to the COVID-19 pandemic

References 

March 2022 events
Timelines of the COVID-19 pandemic in 2022
Responses to the COVID-19 pandemic in 2022